The Miser is an epithet for the following people:

 John Elwes (politician) (1714–1789), British MP and noted eccentric, suggested as an inspiration of the Dickens character Ebenezer Scrooge
 William Jennens (1701–1798), English reclusive financier
 Yossele the Holy Miser or the Miser, 17th century very wealthy Polish Jew who concealed his donations to the poor

See also
 List of people known as the Rich

Miser